Amor prohibido is a 1958 Argentine romantic drama film directed by Luis César Amadori and written by Ulises Petit de Murat. The film was based on the novel Anna Karenina by Russian writer Leo Tolstoy.

Cast
 Zully Moreno
 Jorge Mistral
 Santiago Gómez Cou
 Susana Campos
 Beatriz Taibo
 Xénia Monty
 Francisco López Silva
 Miguel Tilli
 Elsa del Campillo
 Pepita Melia
 Elsa del Campillo
 Mariano Vidal Molina

Release

The film premiered in Argentina on January 16, 1958.

References

External links
 
 Gallery at Acceder

1958 films
1950s Spanish-language films
Argentine black-and-white films
1958 romantic drama films
Films directed by Luis César Amadori
Argentine romantic drama films
1950s Argentine films